Hisashi Yokoshima (横島 久、born 28 December 1957) is a retired Japanese racing driver.

24 Hours of Le Mans results

References

1957 births
Living people
Japanese racing drivers
24 Hours of Le Mans drivers
World Sportscar Championship drivers
Place of birth missing (living people)